Hawaii between the years 1835-1946 had many plantations which required forced labor in order to function. While most of the workforce was made up of immigrants from Asia, in very rare instances African American slaves were shipped to Hawaii from the mainland of the United States. These rare instances were called Alabama camps and represented discrimination against African Americans in Hawaii.

History 
The first plantation in Hawaii was created by William Northey Hooper, in 1836, on Koloa, Kaua’i which changed the course of Hawaiian history. Plantations exploded in Hawaii popping up everywhere as their profits were unmatched by anything else at the time in the area thanks to the tropical climate which promoted growth of crops like coffee, pineapple, and other crops. The immense workload was a major drawback of the plantations and as a result many foreign groups were imported as laborers to work the plantations. While Asian groups such as Japanese, Korean, and Phillipino were the most common there were situations where African American slaves were sent to Hawaii although there were so few they were and still are a tiny percentage of the Hawaiian population. One theorized reason is the fact that African Americans along with other minority groups experienced some of the greatest effects of major illnesses including higher rates of heart disease, cerebrovascular, influenza, pneumonia, etc. Each group of people working on plantations were given a nickname and African Americans were referred to as the Alabama camps. The name of these camps came from where most of the African American slaves came from, Alabama. Dating all the way back to 1901 these laborers were crucial to keep up with the booming sugar plantations all across Hawaii.

Race in the Alabama Camps 
Despite this many African Americans had viewed Hawaii as a sanctuary for them, as it never relied on a social system that involved race, it was only after it was annexed forcibly that they adopted the US view of race. Even after the adoption of America's view on race African Americans were treated normally as their skin tone put them alongside native hawaiians so while still treated worse then white individuals they were treated much better than asian americans in Hawaii which was reflected in how much they were paid for their work. When sent to Hawaii the African Americans became former slaves as Hawaii outlawed slavery in 1852, though they were still treated very similarly.

The Fall 
It was only in 1946 when laborers banded together and collectively left plantations that the mistreatment ended. This occurred because labor unions desperately tried to barter for better working conditions but plantation owners refused and kept pushing off meetings and promises until the unions quit altogether. African Americans assisted with this process by adding their beliefs to the polyarchy, a term used by Robert Dahl, which used many cultural views to approach problems with a unique perspective putting the majority of people first. While not solely responsible the African Americans beliefs certainly made the polyarchy more diverse which helps it to be more effective. Alongside their fellow workers African Americans suddenly were on equal footing with those they had worked under for years and like many others wasted no time making a better life for themselves.

After the Camps 
Unfortunately because of the white influence on Hawaii African Americans still faced discrimination in Hawaii with many experiencing harsher punishments simply because of their ethnicity. Eventually African Americans would be seen as equals in Hawaii through their actions like in the case of Doris Miller who fought hard during the Pearl Harbor attack earning Africans Americans recognition in the military along with other African American heroes. Over the years Hawaii went from using African Amercans as slaves to becoming one of the most ethnically inclusive places on Earth nearly eliminating racism.

References 

Wikipedia Student Program
African-American history of Hawaii
Social history of Hawaii